Rogätz is a municipality in the Börde district in Saxony-Anhalt, Germany. It is located on the left bank of the river Elbe, and is linked to Schartau by the Rogätz Ferry.

References

Börde (district)